Secure (stylised in all caps) is the second mixtape by English rapper and singer Stefflon Don. It was released on 17 August 2018, by 54 London. The mixtape features guest appearances from Future, Ebenezer, Fekky, Haile (from the group WSTRN), Sean Paul, Popcaan, Sizzla, and DJ Khaled. It includes the singles "Senseless" and "Pretty Girl" featuring Tiggs da Author.

Background and release
On 28 May 2018, Don released "Senseless" as the lead single from her upcoming mixtape, which peaked at 65 on the UK Singles Chart. In June 2018, Don revealed that the title of her upcoming mixtape would be Real Tings 2, which included a collaboration with American rapper Future. While performing at Terminal 5 in New York City on 11 July for the 2018 XXL Freshman show, Don said that she would be releasing her second mixtape Secure on 3 August, however it was not released until 17 August 2018.

The mixtape's second single "Pretty Girl" featuring Tiggas Da Author was released on 8 August 2018, peaking at 85 in the UK. On that same day, the mixtape's artwork leaked and it was revealed it pays homage to Lil Kim's The Notorious K.I.M., which sparked tension with rapper Foxy Brown, who blocked Don on Instagram following the leak.

Three days following the release of the second single, Don released the freestyle "Oochie Wally", however the song does not appear on the final track listing of the mixtape. Don then released two promotional singles, "What You Want" with Future and "Lil Bitch", the latter of which came with an accompanying video.

Track listing
Credits adapted from Tidal.

Charts

References

2018 mixtape albums
Stefflon Don albums
Albums produced by DJ Khaled
Albums produced by J. White Did It